The 2009 BH Telecom Indoors doubles was part of the 2009 BH Telecom Indoors professional tennis tournament. Johan Brunström and Frederik Nielsen were the defenders of championship title, but they didn't take part this year; and the title was won by Konstantin Kravchuk and Dawid Olejniczak in the final 6–2, 3–6, 10–7, against James Auckland and Rogier Wassen.

Seeds

Draw

Draw

References
 Main Draw

BH Telecom Indoors - Doubles
2009 Doubles